Armand District is in Khanmirza County of Chaharmahal and Bakhtiari province, Iran. At the 2006 census, the region's population (as the former Armand Rural District of Lordegan County) was 14,320 in 3,016 households. The following census in 2011 counted 16,080 people in 3,906 households. At the latest census in 2016, there were 17,368 inhabitants living in 4,539 households. After the census, Armand Rural District became Armand District, and Lordegan County's Khanmirza District became the Central District in the new county.

References 

Khanmirza County

Districts of Chaharmahal and Bakhtiari Province

Populated places in Chaharmahal and Bakhtiari Province

Populated places in Khanmirza County

fa:بخش ارمند